This article lists the main streets and squares in Lyon, France.

A

 Place Ambroise-Courtois
 Place Ampère
 Rue Antoine Sallès
 Cours Albert Thomas
 Rue de l'Arbre-Sec
 Rue des Archers
 Passage de l'Argue
 Rue Armand Calliat, named for Thomas-Joseph Armand-Calliat, goldsmith, who died in Lyon in 1901.
 Place d'Arsonval
 Rue d'Austerlitz

B

 Rue du Bât-d'Argent
 Boulevard des Belges
 Place Bellecour
 Place Benoît-Crépu
 Rue du Sergent Blandan
 Rue Bichat
 Rue Bossuet
 Rue des Bouquetiers
 Rue de la Bourse
 Boulevard des Brotteaux
 Rue de Brest
 Rue Burdeau
 Rue du Bœuf
 Rue Bugeaud
 Avenue Berthelot

C

 Boulevard des Canuts
 Rue des Capucins
 Montée des Carmélites
 Place Carnot
 Rue du Président Carnot
 Place des Célestins
 Cours Charlemagne
 Rue des Chartreux
 Rue Chevreul
 Rue Claudia
 Rue Constantine
 Rue de Créqui
 Place Croix-Paquet
 Boulevard de la Croix-Rousse
 Grande rue de la Croix-Rousse
 Place de la Croix-Rousse

D
 Rue Dubois
 Rue Duquesne
 Rue Dumenge
 Rue du Dauphiné
 Rue Duguesclin
 Rue Docteur Bonhomme
 Rue Docteur Rebatel

E
 Rue Edmond-Locard
 Boulevard des États-unis
 Rue Édouard-Herriot

F
 Avenue Foch (Lyon)
 Rue du Fort Saint-Irénée
 Avenue des Frères Lumière
 Cours Franklin Roosevelt

G
 Rue de Gadagne
 Cours Gambetta
 Rue Garibaldi
 Montée du Gourguillon
 Rue Grenette
 Grande rue de la Guillotière
 Montée de la Grande Côte

H
 Rue Hénon
 Rue Henri-Germain

I
 Rue d'Ivry

J
 Place des Jacobins
 Avenue Jean Jaurès

 Boulevard Jean XXIII
 Juiverie

K
 Place Kléber (Lyon)

L

 Avenue Lacassagne
 Cours Lafayette
 Rue Lainerie
 Rue Lanterne
 Rue René Leynaud, named for the journalist, poet and Resistance fighter, born in Lyons in 1910.
 Cours de la Liberté
 Rue Longue

M
 Rue Marietton
 Rue des Marronniers
 Rue de Marseille
 Rue Molière
 Rue Montgolfier
 Rue Monseigneur-Lavarenne
 Rue Mazard
 Rue Mercière
 Rue de Montbrillant
 Rue Malesherbes

N
 Place Neuve Saint-Jean

P
 Rue Pasteur
 Rue du Bon Pasteur
 Quai de la Pêcherie
 Rue Pernon
 Quai Perrache
 Avenue du Point-du-Jour
 Place du Point-du-Jour
 Rue de la Poulaillerie
 Rue du Professeur-Patel

Q

 Rue de la Quarantaine

R

 Place Rhodiacéta
 Rue Ruplinger
 Rue de la République
 Rue Romarin
 Quai Romain Rolland
 Rue Rachais
 Rue Royale

S

 Quai Saint-Antoine
 Rue Sainte-Catherine
 Rue Saint-Georges
 Rue Saint-Jean
 Rue Gabriel Sarrazin
 Place Sathonay
 Avenue de Saxe
 Rue Soeur Bouvier
 Cours Suchet

T

 Rue Terme
 Place des Terreaux
 Avenue Thiers
 Passage Thiaffait
 Rue Thomassin
 Avenue Tony-Garnier
 Place de la Trinité
 Place de Trion
 Rue de Trion
 Rue Tronchet
 Impasse Turquet

U
 Rue de l'Université

V

 Rue Vauban
 Cours de Verdun
 Rue Victor-Hugo
 Rue de la Vieille
 Rue Villon
 Cours Vitton
 Grande rue de Vaise
 Rue Vide-Bourse
 Rue de Vendôme
 Boulevard Vivier Merle
 Rue de La Vilette
 Cour des Voraces

See also 
 Arrondissements of Lyon
 Lyon

References

External links
 
 

Lyon
Lyon
Streets
Lyon